Nathaniel Thomas Wetherell MRCS FGS (September 6, 1800 – December 22, 1875) was a British geologist and surgeon. His work involved the collection of various fossils found in England.  He was born, lived, and died in Highgate, England.

Wetherell discovered a strange mixture of rocks and fossils of northern provenance in Coldfall Wood, Muswell Hill in 1835. This led subsequently to the recognition that glaciation had affected southern England.

References

Selected bibliography
Wetherell N.T., 1852, Note on a new species of Clionites (With a Plate.), Annals and Magazine of Natural History 1852. Vol. 10 Jul.-Dec. No. LIX. (No. 59. November 1852.) XXXIII. p. 354.
Wetherell N.T., 1859, On the Structure of some of the Siliceous Nodules of the Chalk, Quarterly Journal of the Geological Society 1859 vol 15 issue 1-2 p. 193.
Wetherell N.T., 1859, On the occurrence of Graphularia Wetherellii in Nodules from the London Clay and the Crag, Quarterly Journal of the Geological Society 1859 vol 15: p. 30-32.

External links
Darwin Project: Wetherell's correspondence with Charles Darwin

1800 births
1875 deaths
19th-century British geologists
People from Highgate
Fellows of the Geological Society of London